

Results

Green denotes finalists

External links
Preliminary Results

Diving at the 2009 World Aquatics Championships
Aqua